A readymade (found object) is a piece of art created from undisguised, but often modified, objects or products that are not normally considered art.

Readymade may also refer to:

 Prefabrication, the practice of assembling components in a factory and transporting complete assemblies to a construction site
"Readymade", a 1996 alternative rock song by Beck from his album Odelay
 "Readymade" (song), a 2006 rock song by the Red Hot Chili Peppers
 ReadyMade (magazine), an American hobby magazine
 Readymades (album), musical album by Chumbawamba

See also
 Readymades of Marcel Duchamp, a variety of ordinary manufactured objects presented by Marcel Duchamp as works of art